The earthworm snake-eel (Yirrkala timorensis) is an eel in the family Ophichthidae (worm/snake eels). It was described by Albert Günther in 1870. It is a tropical, marine eel which is known from the Indo-Pacific. It is known to dwell at a depth of 20 metres. Males can reach a maximum total length of 44 centimetres.

References

Ophichthidae
Fish described in 1870
Taxa named by Albert Günther